Tachiramantis douglasi is a species of frog in the family Strabomantidae. It is found in Colombia and possibly Venezuela. Its natural habitat is tropical moist montane forests. It is threatened by habitat loss.

References

Strabomantidae
Amphibians of Colombia
Endemic fauna of Colombia
Amphibians described in 1996
Taxonomy articles created by Polbot